Lagi Setu (born 25 February 1988) is a Samoa international rugby league footballer.

Early life
Born in Auckland, New Zealand. Setus’ family moved to Ipswich, Queensland, where he was educated at Ipswich Grammar School.
 
He played his junior football in Ipswich Jets, also playing rugby union, before being signed by the St. George Illawarra Dragons.

Playing career
He played for the Dragons' Premier League reserve-grade team in 2006. In round 2 of the 2007 NRL season he made his NRL debut for St. George Illawarra against the Newcastle Knights. In 2008, Setu played twenty games for St. George's Toyota Cup team, scoring 1 try.

On 31 July 2008, Setu signed a contract with the Brisbane Broncos starting in 2009.  Setu played 21 games for Brisbane in the 2009 NRL season as the club reached the preliminary final but were defeated 40-10 by Melbourne.

In 2010, Setu announced he would be leaving the Brisbane Broncos to serve a two-year mission for the Church of Jesus Christ of Latter-day Saints in Birmingham, England starting in 2011.

On 13 September 2012, Setu announced his return from his mission, signing a one-year contract with the Melbourne Storm starting in 2013. His first game was interchange for Storm's 2013 World Club Challenge win over Leeds.

He has signed with the Canberra Raiders for the 2014 NRL season on a two-year deal. Setu didn't make an appearance for the Raiders in the 2014 season.

On 6 November 2014, Setu signed a one-year deal with the Sydney Roosters for the 2015 NRL season.

Representative career
In 2008, Setu was named in the Samoan training squad for the 2008 Rugby League World Cup. He made the final squad and played 2 games.

Rugby Union
After the 2015 Rugby League season, Lagi returned to Rugby Union, signing with Queensland Country.

References

External links
2010 NRL.com profile

1988 births
Living people
Australian Latter Day Saints
Australian Mormon missionaries
Brisbane Broncos players
New Zealand rugby league players
New Zealand rugby union players
New Zealand sportspeople of Samoan descent
Samoa national rugby league team players
Melbourne Storm players
St. George Illawarra Dragons players
Sydney Roosters players
Mount Pritchard Mounties players
Junior Kangaroos players
Rugby league second-rows
Rugby league props
Rugby league locks
Rugby league players from Auckland
Rugby union players from Auckland
Mormon missionaries in England
21st-century Mormon missionaries
New Zealand emigrants to Australia
New Zealand Latter Day Saints
Queensland Country (NRC team) players